is a light gun shooter arcade game developed by Taito and released in 1987. It was ported to many home systems.

The game was critically and commercially successful, becoming one of the highest-grossing arcade games of 1988 and winning the Golden Joystick Award for Game of the Year. Operation Wolf popularized military-themed first-person light gun rail shooters and inspired numerous clones, imitators, and others in the genre over the next decade. It spawned four sequels: Operation Thunderbolt (1988), Operation Wolf 3 (1994), Operation Tiger (1998), and Operation Wolf Returns: First Mission (2023).

Gameplay
Assuming the role of Special Forces Operative Roy Adams, the player attempts to rescue five hostages who are being held captive in enemy territory. The game is viewed from a first-person perspective, and is on rails, with the screen  scrolling horizontally through the landscape. The game is divided into six stages, each of which advances the story when completed. For example, after the jungle stage is completed, Adams interrogates an enemy soldier and learns the location of the concentration camp where the hostages are being held.

The game uses an optical controller housed inside a gun assembly  which bears a strong resemblance to an Uzi submachine gun. This, in turn, is mounted on top of a square base covering the pivot shaft which allows players to swivel and elevate the gun. A geared motor inside the casing simulates the recoil when the player fires the weapon. 
Pulling the trigger allows fully automatic fire, and pressing a button near the muzzle launches a grenade with a wide blast radius that can hit multiple targets.

In order to complete each stage, the player must shoot a required number of soldiers and vehicles (trucks, boats, helicopters, armored transports), as indicated by an on-screen counter. The player begins with a limited supply of ammunition and grenades, but can find more throughout the game, either openly displayed or revealed by shooting crates and barrels, coconuts in trees, and animals such as pigs and chickens. Dynamite bombs cause heavy damage to every target on the screen, both enemy and friendly, and a special machine gun power-up allows unlimited ammunition and an increased rate of fire for 10 seconds.

Enemies attack with gunfire, knives, grenades, mortar and bazooka rounds, and missiles; all visible incoming projectiles can be shot out of the air. The player has a damage bar that slowly fills due to enemy attacks or shooting friendly targets such as nurses and boys. Damage can be recovered by collecting health power-ups and completing stages.

The six stages, and their objectives and effects on gameplay after completion, are as follows:

 Communication setup. Mission: Obstruct. Completing this stage reduces the number of enemies the player must eliminate in all other stages.
 Jungle—Mission: Intelligence. Completing this stage allows the player to access the concentration camp.
 Village. Mission: Rest. Completing this stage heals a large amount of the player's damage, as opposed to a small amount after all other stages.
 Powder magazine. Mission: Ammunition. Completing this stage grants the player a full supply of ammunition (nine spare magazines and one loaded into the weapon) and either five additional grenades or a total of eight, whichever is less.
 Concentration camp. Mission: Aim. The player must protect the five hostages as they run to safety. In order to advance to the airport stage, at least one hostage must survive.
 Airport. Mission: Getaway. The player must protect the surviving hostages as they run toward the open hatch of an airplane taxiing down a runway, then shoot down a final, heavily armed helicopter. Skipping the powder magazine or village stages adds two helicopters or two armored vehicles to this stage, respectively.

Completing the airport stage with at least one hostage rescued awards a bonus based on the number of stages played and the number of hostages who boarded the plane. A new operation then begins at a higher difficulty level, with a fully healed damage bar and a fresh supply of ammunition.

The game ends if any of the following events occur, with each outcome showing a different game over screen:

 The damage bar fills completely, resulting in the death of the player's character.
 The ammunition and grenade supplies are exhausted, resulting in the player's character being taken prisoner.
 None of the hostages escape the concentration camp.
 None of them successfully board the plane at the airport, resulting in an infuriated rebuke from the President for failing the mission.

Continuing the game allows the player to restart the stage.

When the language of the game is set to English, the six stages are always played in the above order. As a result, the effects of the communication setup and jungle are not obvious, and the number of enemies in a particular stage remains constant from one operation to the next. When the language is set to Japanese, only the first four stages are initially available and the player may choose the order of play, allowing for strategic planning.

The Nintendo Entertainment System version allows multiple endings depending on the number of rescued hostages. The player is awarded points in the form of combat pay and is greeted by the President of the United States. The number of surviving hostages corresponded with the president's tone to the player:
 0 - Angry
 1 - Unhappy
 2 - Disappointed
 3 - Satisfied
 4 - Happy
 5 - Very happy

Home conversions

The game was converted to the Amstrad CPC, DOS, NES, Amiga 500, Atari ST, Master System, FM Towns, Commodore 64, PC Engine, and ZX Spectrum. Most lack any kind of light gun support (with the exceptions of the NES and Master System) and must be played with a keyboard or a controller. In 1989, a special ZX Spectrum version with Magnum Light Phaser support was produced for inclusion in Amstrad's ZX Spectrum +2 and +3 'Action Pack' hardware bundles. The box for the Master System version features promotional art from Operation Thunderbolt.

In 2005, Operation Wolf was released on the Xbox, PlayStation 2, and Microsoft Windows as part of Taito Legends; however, light gun support is unavailable. The NES version of Operation Wolf was released on the North American Wii Virtual Console in February 2008. Whereas the NES version allows NES Zapper support, the VC re-release does not feature any kind of light gun support (including the Wii Remote's pointer functions), making the game only playable with the standard controller mode.

Reception

Commercial performance
The game was commercially successful. In Japan, Game Machine listed Operation Wolf in its December 1, 1987 issue as the second most-successful upright/cockpit arcade cabinet of the month, and it went on to become the second highest-grossing arcade game of 1988 (below Sega's After Burner and After Burner II). In Europe, Operation Wolf debuted as the top-grossing arcade game of October 1987 in the United Kingdom, and again topped the charts in December 1987; it held the top spot through March 1988, and remained in the top five through July, when it was number four on the Coinslot dedicated arcade game chart (below Street Fighter, Continental Circus, and WEC Le Mans). Operation Wolf went on to become the top-earning arcade game of 1988 in the United Kingdom. In the United States, Operation Wolf was one of the top five highest-grossing dedicated arcade games of 1988.

The home computer conversions topped the UK sales charts in late 1988 until it was replaced by RoboCop which held the number one position for most of 1989.

Critical response
Upon release in arcades, the game received wide acclaim from critics, particularly for its gameplay, graphics, and controls. However, it also received some criticism for its violence, particularly in the UK press following the Hungerford massacre that had occurred a few months before its release. Commodore User said it beats Sega's After Burner as "the game of the year and much of next year too" but that it may draw some controversy from tabloids for its Rambo-like violent content. Clare Edgeley of Computer and Video Games called it one of the best new releases, stating that, though excessively violent, it was an "extremely playable" and "powerful" fast-paced action game. Your Sinclair called it a "fast and furious" action game, and said it "broke a bit of new 'ground' for arcade games 'cos the 'nasties' fired directly at you through the screen".

The home computer conversions also received positive reviews. Your Sinclair gave the ZX Spectrum conversion a highly positive review. The NES version received more mixed reviews. In Electronic Gaming Monthlys review of the NES conversion, three critics scored it 6/10, one 8/10.

Accolades
Sinclair User gave the arcade game the "Over The Top Game of 1988" award, for the "shooting game most likely to push you over the edge" in 1988. The home computer conversions won several awards at the 1989 Golden Joystick Awards for 1988, including overall Game of the Year (8-bit), Best Coin-Op Conversion (8-bit), and Best Coin-Op Conversion (16-bit). It was later voted number 26 in the "Your Sinclair Readers' Top 100 Games of All Time" poll. Crash awarded it a Crash Smash. Computer and Video Games awarded it a CVG Hit.

Legacy
Operation Wolf influenced the market upon release. It is credited with evolving the light gun shooter genre. It departed from the shooting gallery, carnival, and cartoon themes that had previously dominated the genre for decades, from electro-mechanical games in the 1960s until Nintendo's Duck Hunt in 1984, and moved the genre toward more realistic, violent, and military shooter themes. In contrast to Taito's earlier gun games including Attack (1976), N.Y. Captor (1985), and Cycle Shooting (1986) which have simple cartoon graphics, Operation Wolf has more realistic graphics. This provides a depth of perspective by using different sized sprites.

Operation Wolf took the military themes of 1980s run and gun video games (such as Commando, Green Beret, and Ikari Warriors) and action films (such as Rambo and Commando) and applied them to light gun shooters. It presents a prisoner of war (POW) rescue mission with massive violence, killing masses of enemy soldiers, which was novel for light gun shooters at the time. It innovated on the mounted gun mechanismused before in Taito's Attack and even older Midway mechanical games from the 1960sby using an optical light gun sensor along with a geared motor that makes the player feel the kick when pulling the trigger. It spawned many arcade shooters with mounted machine gun controls and increasing levels of violence during the late 1980s to early 1990s.

The game popularized first-person light gun rail shooters and inspired numerous clones and imitators during the late 1980s to early 1990s. Examples include SNK's Mechanized Attack and Sega's Line of Fire in 1989, SNK's Beast Busters in 1990, Namco's Steel Gunner and Midway's Terminator 2 in 1991, and Konami's Lethal Enforcers in 1992. Further influenced by Operation Wolf, the genre remained popular into the late 1990s and declined following the rise of the first-person shooter (FPS) genre.

Operation Wolf spawned four sequels: Operation Thunderbolt (1988), Operation Wolf 3 (1994), Operation Tiger (1998), and Operation Wolf Returns: First Mission (2023).

Notes

References

External links

1987 video games
Amiga games
Amstrad CPC games
Arcade video games
Atari ST games
Commodore 64 games
DOS games
FM Towns games
Golden Joystick Award winners
Golden Joystick Award for Game of the Year winners
Light gun games
MSX games
Master System games
Nintendo Entertainment System games
Ocean Software games
Rail shooters
Square Enix franchises
Taito arcade games
TurboGrafx-16 games
Video games about terrorism
Video games scored by Jean Baudlot
Virtual Console games
ZX Spectrum games
Video games developed in Japan